is a Japanese football club based in Kariya, Aichi.

History
The club was formed in 1946 under its parent company's then-official English name Toyoda Automatic Loom Works, and co-founded the original Japan Soccer League (JSL) in 1965 ("Original Eight"). In the first three seasons of the league the club struggled and was relegated in 1967 when it lost a promotion/relegation series to neighbors and also JSL co-founders Nagoya Mutual Bank, who had been relegated themselves the year before and were looking to get back into the top division again. Thus, Toyota ALW took their place in the Tōkai Regional League.

In 1972 the club was given a second chance at national league stardom by co-founding the JSL's new Second Division, but finished in bottom place and was saved from relegation by the fact that the JSL was expanding to increase the First Division's size to 10. The following season they stumbled again despite finishing in 9th place and lost another promotion/relegation series, this time to Hitachi Ibaraki, a sister and de facto reserve club to the main Hitachi club at the time based in Tokyo. The 1972 season was also shared with neighbor and sister club Toyota Motors, which was promoted as champion and eventually became known as J. League powerhouse Nagoya Grampus.

Since then the Toyoda ALW club has been going back and forth between the Tōkai Regional League and the Aichi Prefectural League, with their most recent Tōkai stint coming from promotion into the former's Division 2 in 2003 and ending with relegation to the prefectural division in 2005.

Club Name
1946–2000: Toyoda Automatic Loom Works SC
2001–present: Toyota Industries SC

League history

Honours

Titles

Aichi Prefectural League: 4
1986, 1991, 2003, 2013.

See also
Toyota Industries
Toyota Industries Shuttles

Notes

External links
Official Blog

 
Association football clubs established in 1946
Sports teams in Aichi Prefecture
Football clubs in Japan
Toyota
Japan Soccer League clubs
1946 establishments in Japan
Works association football clubs in Japan